Foros is a boutique investment bank headquartered in New York.  Founded in 2009 by former Deutsche Bank M&A chief Jean Manas, the firm provides divestitures, joint ventures, capital raising, spin-offs and split-offs, raid defense, and mergers and acquisitions advisory services.

In its first months of operation, Foros advised Virgin Mobile USA on its $680 million sale to Sprint Nextel and Ciena Corporation on its $520 million purchase of Nortel’s Metronet Ethernet Networks. In November 2009, Foros advised IMS Health in its $5.2 billion acquisition by the private equity firm TPG and the Canada Pension Plan.  This was the largest private equity sale in 2009.

After its initial year, the firm has played a role in several large transactions.  In 2010, Foros advised Interactive Data Corp. (IDC) in its $3.4 billion acquisition by Silver Lake Partners and Warburg Pincus. In 2011, Foros advised Medco on its $28.5 billion sale to Express Scripts with JP Morgan and Lazard.

More recently, in 2016, Foros advised EarthLink on its $1.1 billion merger with Windstream; CA Technologies on its €600 million cross-border acquisition of Austrian-based Automic; Consolidated Communications on its $1.5 billion acquisition of Fairpoint Communications; and Intersil on its $3.2 billion cross-border sale to Renesas of Japan.

In 2011, league table agencies ranked Foros among the top 15 M&A advisors and among the five top independent advisory firms in the U.S. In 2015, Bloomberg ranked Foros 28th among takeover advisers in the U.S.

References

Banks based in New York (state)
Financial services companies established in 2009
Banks established in 2009
Investment banks in the United States